Ronald Hazlehurst (13 March 1928 – 1 October 2007) was an English composer and conductor who, having joined the BBC in 1961, became its Light Entertainment Musical Director.

Hazlehurst composed the theme tunes for many well-known British sitcoms and gameshows of the 1970s and the 1980s, including Yes Minister, Are You Being Served?, I Didn't Know You Cared and Last of the Summer Wine.

Early life
Ronald Hazlehurst was born in Dukinfield, Cheshire, in 1928, to a railway worker father and a piano teacher mother. Having attended Hyde County Grammar School, he left at the age of 14 and became a clerk in a cotton mill for £1 a week. From 1947 to 1949 he did his National Service as a bandsman in the 4th/7th Royal Dragoon Guards.

During his spare time, he played in a band, and soon became a professional musician earning £4 a week. The band appeared on the BBC Light Programme, but Hazlehurst left when he was refused a pay rise. Moving to Manchester, he became a freelance musician until he was offered a place in another band at a nightclub in London. Ronnie Hazlehurst worked at Granada for about a year in 1955 and, after he left there, worked on a market stall in Watford to make ends meet.

BBC career
Hazlehurst joined the BBC in 1961, and became a staff arranger; his early works included the incidental music for The Likely Lads, The Liver Birds and It's a Knockout. In 1968 he became the Light Entertainment Musical Director and, during his tenure, he composed the theme tunes of many sitcoms, including Are You Being Served?; Some Mothers Do 'Ave 'Em; Last of the Summer Wine (where he also wrote all the instrumental music for the show); I Didn't Know You Cared; The Fall and Rise of Reginald Perrin; To the Manor Born; Yes, Minister; Yes, Prime Minister; Just Good Friends; and Three Up, Two Down. He also arranged the themes for Butterflies, Sorry!, and the first series of Only Fools and Horses. In addition, he wrote the theme tunes for the sketch show The Two Ronnies, the game shows Blankety Blank, Odd One Out and Bruce Forsyth's The Generation Game and the chat show Wogan.
His theme tunes often included elements designed to fit the programmes, such as a cash till in Are You Being Served?, rises and falls in The Fall and Rise of Reginald Perrin and the Big Ben chimes for Yes Minister. For Some Mothers Do 'Ave 'Em, Hazlehurst used Morse code to spell out the programme's title. During his BBC career he composed the music for the opening of the BBC's coverage of the 1976 Olympics. He left the BBC in the 1990s.

Other work
Hazlehurst was also involved with the Eurovision Song Contest and was the musical director when the event was hosted by the United Kingdom in 1974, 1977 and 1982. He also conducted the British entry on seven occasions, in 1977, 1982, 1987, 1988, 1989, 1991 and 1992. In 1977, as well as conducting the British entry, he also conducted the German entry. To conduct the British entry that year, Lynsey de Paul and Mike Moran, he used a closed umbrella instead of a baton and wore a bowler hat.

He also arranged and conducted two singers' performances of their voice-overs for opening credits, Clare Torry for Butterflies ("Love Is like a Butterfly") and Paul Nicholas for Just Good Friends.

He also recorded some LPs and CDs with his orchestra including a 2-CD box set of Laurel and Hardy film music; his orchestra also backed singer Marti Caine on an album that was released on CD.

Later years
Hazlehurst moved from Hendon, North London, to Guernsey in about 1997. In 1999, he was awarded a Gold Badge from the British Academy of Composers and Songwriters.

Music was Hazlehurst's life and passion as well as his work and he continued to work right up to his heart bypass operation in October 2006. On 27 September 2007 he suffered a stroke and, without regaining consciousness, died on 1 October in Princess Elizabeth Hospital, St Martin, Guernsey. Having been married twice, with two sons from his second marriage, at the time of his death his partner was Jean Fitzgerald.

References

External links

1928 births
2007 deaths
BBC people
English conductors (music)
British male conductors (music)
Eurovision Song Contest conductors
English television composers
English male composers
People from Dukinfield
20th-century British conductors (music)
20th-century British male musicians